Winter Wonderland an album by Canadian jazz singer Emilie-Claire Barlow.

Track listing
 "What Are You Doing New Year's Eve?"
 "Winter Wonderland"
 "Sleigh Ride"
 "Santa Baby"
 "Christmas Time Is Here"
 "Baby, It's Cold Outside"
 "Little Jack Frost"
 "I've Got My Love to Keep Me Warm"
 "Let It Snow! Let It Snow! Let It Snow!"
 "Angels' Lullaby"
 "(Everybody's Waitin' for) The Man with the Bag"

References

2006 albums
Emilie-Claire Barlow albums
Christmas albums by Canadian artists